"True Blue Love" is a single by Lou Gramm, from his second solo album Long Hard Look, released in 1989 (See 1989 in music).

Chart positions

References

1989 songs
1989 singles
Songs written by Lou Gramm
Songs written by Peter Wolf (producer)
Atlantic Records singles
Song recordings produced by Peter Wolf (producer)